Baby Ruby is a 2022 American psychological horror-thriller film written and directed by Bess Wohl, in her directorial debut. It stars Noémie Merlant, Kit Harington, and Meredith Hagner.

The film had its world premiere at the Toronto International Film Festival on September 9, 2022. It was released on February 3, 2023, by Magnet Releasing.

Cast
 Noémie Merlant as Jo
 Kit Harington as Spencer
 Meredith Hagner as Shelly
 Reed Birney as Dr. Rosenbaum
 Jayne Atkinson as Doris

Release
The film had its world premiere at the Toronto International Film Festival on September 9, 2022. Shortly after, Magnet Releasing acquired US distribution rights to the film. It is scheduled to be released on February 3, 2023.

Reception
On Rotten Tomatoes, the film holds an approval rating of 69% based on reviews from 39 critics, with an average rating of 6.3/10. The website's consensus reads, "A flawed but finely cut gem, Baby Ruby puts the horror of new parenthood under a frighteningly effective magnifying glass." 

In a review for San Francisco Chronicle, Bob Strauss wrote: "Playwright Bess Wohl’s feature-directing debut is a sly, mutant meld of horror thriller, feminist satire and subjective, postpartum paranoia study. It’s serious about how the demands of baby care can overwhelm, and skeptical of societal pressures on women to not just accept but love motherhood’s burdens."

References

External links
 
 

2022 directorial debut films
2022 horror thriller films
2022 independent films
2022 psychological thriller films
2020s American films
2020s pregnancy films
2020s psychological horror films
American horror thriller films
American pregnancy films
American psychological horror films
American psychological thriller films
FilmNation Entertainment films
Films about parenting
Postpartum depression in film